The Great Northern Railway (Ireland) T class were 4-4-2T Atlantic locomotives built by Beyer, Peacock and Company in 1913. Five of this type were built. They were later rebuilt with superheaters as class T1. 

As the T1 class, they featured 18 x 24 inch or 18½ x 24 inch cylinders with 5 foot 9 inch wheels, built to 5 feet 3 inches gauge.

References 

T
Steam locomotives of Ireland
Steam locomotives of Northern Ireland
5 ft 3 in gauge locomotives
Beyer, Peacock locomotives
4-4-2T locomotives
Railway locomotives introduced in 1913
Scrapped locomotives
2′B1′ n2t locomotives
2′B1′ h2t locomotives